Coleophora turkestanica is a moth of the family Coleophoridae.

The larvae feed on the generative organs of Caroxylon turkestanicum.

References

turkestanica
Moths described in 1989